The FAMAS (Fusil d'Assaut de la Manufacture d'Armes de Saint-Étienne, "Assault Rifle from the Saint-Étienne Weapon Factory") is a bullpup assault rifle designed and manufactured in France by MAS in 1978, a year after the Austrian Steyr AUG. It is known by French troops as Le Clairon (The Bugle) due to its distinctive shape. The FAMAS is recognised for its high rate of fire at 1,100 rounds per minute. Beginning in 2017, the FAMAS was replaced in most frontline units in the French Army by the HK416F, and the FAMAS is expected to remain in limited service until 2028.

History
The first French bullpup rifles were developed between 1946 and 1950 at the AME (Atelier Mécanique de Mulhouse) and MAS, testing rounds such as .30 US Carbine, 7.92×33mm Kurz, 7.65×38mm (Made by Cartoucherie de Valence) and some other intermediate calibers. Since France was engaged in the First Indochina War at the time, and was also the second-largest contributor to NATO, the research budgets for new types of weapons were limited and priority was given to the modernisation and production of existing service weapons. Nevertheless, approximately forty different 7.62×51mm NATO calibre prototype rifles were developed between 1952 and 1962, most notably the FA-MAS Type 62. However, the United States adoption of the M16 rifle and 5.56×45mm cartridge caused the French to rethink their approach, and consequently the Type 62 was not adopted.

In the 1960s, MAS began to manufacture under licence the Heckler & Koch G3 battle rifle and later on the Heckler & Koch HK33 assault rifle as temporary substitutes. At the same time, the French embraced the idea of developing a new 5.56 mm automatic rifle. However, simply adopting the German-designed HK33 rifle was considered unsatisfactory for many members of the French high command. General Marcel Bigeard was also against the idea of relying on foreign weapons; while visiting the Manufacture d'Armes de Saint-Étienne, he asked the engineers to develop a homemade French 5.56 mm automatic rifle, which subsequently led to the creation and adoption of the FAMAS.

The FAMAS project began in 1967 under the direction of General Paul Tellié (1919-2014) and the first prototype was completed in 1971, with French military evaluation of the rifle beginning in 1972. When production problems delayed the general issue of the new rifles, and with the 1978 Battle of Kolwezi showing an immediate need for a more modern weapon to stand on equal terms with assault rifles armed enemy forces, the French Army began searching for an emergency temporary rifle until the FAMAS came into full production.

While the Heckler & Koch HK33 was considered, with a batch of 1,200 examples tested, it was ultimately turned down in favor of the SIG SG 540, built under licence by  Manurhin (Manufacture de Machines du Haut Rhin) as a temporary resort, until enough domestically-built FAMAS rifles were produced to issue to French forces. In late 1978, the French military accepted the FAMAS as their standard-issue rifle, the FAMAS F1.

FAMAS F1

After adoption by the French military, the FAMAS F1 replaced both the elderly MAS 49/56 rifle and MAT-49 submachine gun. Approximately 400,000 FAMAS F1 assault rifles were produced by MAS. While a capable rifle, the F1 had numerous problems to overcome. For instance, many plastic pieces on the rifle easily broke, including critical parts like the cheek riser on the butt's pad below where the cheek is to go. The FAMAS was also susceptible to malfunction on occasion because of poorly-built, or rather improperly used, magazines. The FAMAS was designed around the concept of single-use, disposable magazines; when the limited budget of the French military forced soldiers to reuse disposable magazines over and over, the FAMAS would jam and require immediate attention. MAS would eventually manufacture more durable magazines for the FAMAS that reduced malfunctions.

The F1 was followed by the G1 version that included several minor improvements, such as redesigned grips and an enlarged trigger guard for operation with gloves. However, the G1 remained conceptual and was never actually produced.

FAMAS G2
The FAMAS G2 was developed in 1994 to comply with NATO standards by accepting standard NATO magazines and by employing tighter barrel rifling to accurately fire both older 5.56 mm  ammunition and new standard 5.56×45mm NATO  ammunition. The ammunition specific lever-delayed blowback mechanism of the FAMAS F1 designed around French  steel cased ammunition was slightly revised for reliably using 5.56×45mm NATO ammunition. The FAMAS G2 also included several other upgrades taken from the G1 model, such as an enlarged trigger guard and improved hand guards made from reinforced fiberglass instead of plastic, and also the ability to take standard brass cased ammunition as well as French made steel ammunition. The French Navy purchased the FAMAS G2 in 1995 and issued it to their Fusiliers Marins and Commandos Marine. However, the French army refused to purchase the G2, preferring to rely on the FAMAS F1 as their primary rifle.

FAMAS Infantry
The FAMAS Infantry is an improvement of the FAMAS F1, obtained by retrofitting an accessory rail onto the top of the handguard. This allows mounting combat optics, most notably reflex sights or the 4×26.4 SCROME J4 telescopic sight.

MAS .223 

During the late 1980s, Century Arms imported a very small number of semi-automatic FAMAS rifles into the United States. Due to poor sales, production and importation ceased and the existing number are not only extremely rare but cost in the range of $25,000 with no spare parts available on the market.

FAMAS Commando
GIAT made short-barreled FAMAS rifles to market them internationally, but there was no interest.

Design details

Action

The FAMAS assault rifle is a bullpup configuration, with the ammunition feed behind the trigger. The receiver housing is made of a special steel alloy, and the rifle furniture is made of fiberglass. The rifle uses a lever-delayed blowback action, an action type also used in the French AA-52 machine gun derived from the prototypes built during Army Technical Department tests having taken place between the First and Second World Wars.

Ergonomics

Fire mode is controlled by a selector within the trigger guard, with three settings:  safe (central position), single shot (to the right), and automatic fire (to the left). Automatic fire can be in three-shot bursts (rafale) or fully automatic; this is determined by another selector, located under the housing and behind the magazine.

The FAMAS G2 weighs . The G1 and G2 have a large, grip-length trigger-guard like that of the Steyr AUG to allow easy access to the trigger when wearing gloves.

Both F1 and G2 models of the FAMAS feature a bipod attached to the upper hand-guard.

The FAMAS-G2 and some F1 sport a  "polyvalent hand-guard" which features a standard NATO Accessory Rail, allowing a variety of sights to be mounted, notably red dot sights and night vision units.

Ammunition

The FAMAS uses a delayed blowback operating system that functions best with French-specified steel-casing 5.56×45mm ammunition. Using standard brass-casing 5.56×45mm NATO ammunition employed by other armies can create over-pressure and case ruptures in the FAMAS during extraction, which can lead to severe malfunctions. Using incorrectly built ammunition also results in approximately two minor injuries for every million rounds fired from a FAMAS. As a result, the French military has discreetly banned the use of foreign-produced ammunition in all French-issued FAMAS rifles. However, fluting the chamber will completely remove these malfunctions, although the brass casings will still be deformed and will not be able to be reloaded without reshaping.

The FAMAS F1 uses a proprietary 25-round magazine.

The FAMAS G2 uses M16-type, NATO-compatible 30-round STANAG magazines. It has a chrome-lined barrel with 1 turn in 9 inch (1:9 inch) rifling and functions equally well with both the older  (M193 type) ammo and the newer  (SS109 type) ammo.

During training with blank ammunition, a special plug is added to the muzzle of the FAMAS. This plug is necessary for automatic or semi-automatic blank fire operation, and functions by blocking part of the gas used in a blank cartridge.

Rifle grenades
The FAMAS can use a variety of rifle grenades up to 500 grams. Notable examples include the antipersonnel APAV40 and the antitank AC58.

The FAMAS features two alidades for aiming rifle grenades with several modes:
 direct fire at 75 or 100 metres, in anti-vehicle role
 indirect fire, in anti-personnel role:
 with the FAMAS inclined by 45°, allowing fire from 120 to 340 metres
 with the FAMAS inclined by 75°, allowing fire from 60 to 170 metres
In indirect fire mode the grenade support (more exactly named "grenade enforcement ring" in French) is moved forwards or backwards on the barrel which has markings (12/13?). This changes the position of the grenade on the barrel and automatically the volume of the chamber in which the gas expands to push the grenade forward. Each position of the grenade support has a number which is multiplied by a certain fixed number depending on the alidade position, 45° or 75°; this will accurately indicate the firing distance of the grenade.

The FAMAS can also accommodate an external grenade launcher as an add-on module under the hand guard; the US M203 grenade launcher is sometimes used.

Service

The FAMAS first saw service in Chad during Operation Manta and again in desert operations during Operation Desert Storm and in other various missions. Officially, operational conditions proved the weapon to be reliable and trustworthy under combat conditions. The FAMAS is affectionately known by French-speaking troops as le Clairon ("the Bugle") because of its shape. An improved version of the FAMAS F1 is integrated in the Félin system.

Senegal and the United Arab Emirates received a small number of FAMAS F1 rifles from France, though it was unknown when they received them. Djibouti uses this weapon in its military and the gendarmerie as the standard infantry weapon. The Philippines also received a limited number and is used by the Philippine National Police Special Action Force.

Conflicts
The FAMAS has been used in the following conflicts:

Replacement

In 2017, the French armed forces began the retirement of the FAMAS in favor of the German-made HK416 rifle.

When the Manufacture d'Armes de Saint-Etienne (MAS) factory closed in 2002, no more domestic rifles could be made. The last batch of newly produced FAMAS rifles, built in 2002, saw more than a decade of heavy service by 2016. To date, the French armed forces currently use an estimated 400,000 FAMAS F1 and G2 rifles still stored in their arsenal. The military also ceased manufacture of special steel-case ammunition for the FAMAS. Because the FAMAS did not function properly with NATO standard brass-cased ammunition (chamber fluting can allow the F1 to use brass cases but only G2 rifles can use common STANAG magazines), and coupled with concern over the age of existing weapons, the French military sought a replacement for the FAMAS rifle.  

In May 2014, the French Ministry of Defense announced a European Union-wide tender for a minimum of 90,000 rifles and carbines to be issued across the entire French armed forces. In August 2016, the Ministry of Defense selected Heckler and Koch's HK416 rifle to replace the FAMAS as the new general-issue service rifle. Under the French contract, the new rifle was designated as the HK416F, with 'F' standing for French version. 16,000 rifles will be annually purchased until a final total of 90,000 to 102,000 rifles are delivered. The new rifles are expected to remain in active French service for at least 30 years.

The FAMAS will be issued to the French National Guard and domestic police units, and will continue to serve in reserve and non-combat units until 2028, when a phaseout of the FAMAS with the HK416 can occur.

Users

:Special forces 

 
 : Presidential Guard and Army
 
 : Used by the GIGN and French Armed Forces since 1979, with over 700,000 rifles purchased. Began to be replaced by the Heckler & Koch HK416 starting in 2017. Also used by several law enforcement agencies.
 
 : Komando Pasukan Katak (KOPASKA) tactical diver group and Komando Pasukan Khusus (Kopassus) special forces group.
: Iraqi insurgents
 : Alassane Ouattara's FRCI are said to have received some FAMAS in 2011 but that claim is disputed.
  Kanak and Socialist National Liberation Front
 
 
 
 : A few FAMAS F1s used by loyalist militiamen, Jamaat Jund al-Qawqaz, Islamic State and Kurds

See also
 HS Produkt VHS

Sources and references

External links

 Official Nexter FAMAS page
  Buddy Hinton FAMAS Photo Collection
 FELIN article, with FAMAS pictured as part of FELIN system
 Modern Firearms 
 REMTEK
 FAMAS
 The Firearm blog: R.I.P General Paul Tellié, father of the FAMAS
 Nazarian's Gun's Recognition Guide (MANUAL) FAMAS .223 Manual (.pdf)

 

5.56×45mm NATO assault rifles
Bullpup rifles
Cold War weapons of France
Lever-delayed blowback firearms
Military equipment introduced in the 1980s
Nexter Systems
Assault rifles of France
Rifles of the Cold War
Weapons and ammunition introduced in 1978